Murulla is a locality in the Hunter Region of New South Wales, Australia, located on the New England Highway and Main North railway line. A now closed railway station which opened in 1872 was located there, no trace now remains. It is the site of a serious railway accident that occurred in 1926.

References

Suburbs of Upper Hunter Shire
Towns in the Hunter Region
Main North railway line, New South Wales